N18 may refer to:

Roads
 N18 road (Belgium), a National Road of Belgium
 Route nationale 18, in France
 N18 road (Ireland) 
 A18 motorway (Netherlands) 
 N18 (South Africa)
 Nebraska Highway 18, in the United States

Other uses
 BMW N18, an automobile engine
 Chronic kidney disease
 , a submarine of the Royal Navy
 London Buses route N18
 Nissan Almera (N18), a Japanese automobile
 Nitrogen-18, an isotope of nitrogen
 Tinak Airport, on Arno Atoll, Marshall Islands 
 N18, a postcode district in the N postcode area